Osterfjorden is a fjord in Vestland county, Norway. The fjord is one of three fjords surrounding the island of Osterøy. The fjord runs along the municipal border of Alver and Osterøy municipalities. The fjord begins at the Romarheimsfjorden and flows to the west for  before ending near the village of Knarvik at the confluence of four fjords: Osterfjorden, Radfjorden (to the north), Sørfjorden (to the south), and Salhusfjorden (to the west).

The following villages lie along the Osterfjorden: Knarvik, Hamre, Leknes, Eikanger, Hosanger, Fotlandsvåg, Ostereidet, and Tysso.  Historically, the old municipality of Hosanger encompassed the land on both sides of the fjord, with the fjord running through the middle of the municipality.

See also
 List of Norwegian fjords

References

Fjords of Vestland
Alver (municipality)
Osterøy